Jubilee was an Indie rock band from Hollywood, California. The band was formed in  2007 by Aaron North (vocals, guitar) and also consists of Tony Bevilacqua (guitar), Jenni Tarma (bass), and Troy "Boy" Petrey (drums).

According to an early press release, Jubilee's sound is "something like The Replacements, The Stone Roses, Neil Young, Blur, Jane's Addiction, Bob Dylan, Creedence Clearwater Revival, and The Verve, all sliced ‘n diced together quite nicely."

Jubilee's output consists of two limited release singles via North's Buddyhead Records. They released the “Rebel Hiss” single on January 21, 2008 on 7-inch vinyl, CD, and a limited edition "tour-version" 7-inch. Their second single, "In With The Out Crowd", was released in Fall 2008 on 7-inch, and CD. The band has stated a general dislike for both releases, as well as constant frustration stemming from people assuming that both releases are E.P.'s, instead of, "A bunch of songs that just simply aren't as good as the ones chosen for the album. They're throwaways." There are no plans of re-pressing either release once the remaining copies are sold. The CD version of "In With The Out Crowd" has already sold out, and the 7-inch versions of both releases are said to have as well. Other estimates point to a couple dozen still being available on the band's web-store. The estrangement between Aaron and Buddyhead, which both releases are on, would only solidify the notion that the band would prefer that these releases were unavailable.

Jubilee's next release reportedly consists of a number of stark and somber recordings, all of which were captured live in North's home. These sessions took place over the course of 2009, a year in which the band was suspiciously absent from any type of public activity. Various rumors concerning Jubilee throughout 2009, some of which have even been admitted to and confirmed by certain band members as being, "Very, very dark times. Awful, actually."  Their subsequently solemn, and casual approach to these recordings, and the resulting sound, has also been described by band members as a conscious effort to get the absolute furthest away that they could from how their album was created. Almost all of the music for these sessions is performed on acoustic guitars, and absent of both drums and bass guitar. Finishing with more material than they'd intended, an E.P., entitled "After The Crash", ultimately seemed the better answer instead of just another "single". Oddly though, "After The Crash" will only be made available to those who subscribed to the "Jubilee Digital Music Service". The 7-inch vinyl E.P. will be released through a new label North has started, White/Grey/Black. This will be the label's first release, and it will be mailed directly to the subscribers. Their packages, along with the record, will also contain directions for accessing MP3, WAV and FLAC digital formats of the E.P. as well, via Topspin. Subscribers will also receive even more exclusive songs on top of those on the 7-inch. These tracks will only be available in digital formats though, also through Topspin. These bonus tracks were excluded from the 7-inch, due to the limited space available on records of that size.

Discography
Rebel Hiss (Single, 2008.)
In With the Out Crowd (Single, 2008.)
Live In Belfast (2009)

References

External links
Jubilee official website
 Article on Jubilee at Buddyhead
Article on Jubilee  at Drowned in Sound
Isolate by the hour - an amateur's guide to Jubilee

Musical groups from Los Angeles
Musical groups established in 2007
Alternative rock groups from California